The 1982 Stella Artois Championships, also known as the Queen's Club Championships, was a men's tennis tournament played on outdoor grass courts at the Queen's Club in London in the United Kingdom that was part of the 1982 Volvo Grand Prix circuit. It was the 80th edition of the tournament and was held from 7 June through 13 June 1982. Second-seeded Jimmy Connors won the singles title.

Finals

Singles

 Jimmy Connors defeated  John McEnroe 7–5, 6–3
 It was Connors' 4th title of the year and the 106th of his career.

Doubles

 John McEnroe /  Peter Rennert defeated  Victor Amaya /  Hank Pfister 7–6, 7–5
 It was McEnroe's 4th title of the year and the 77th of his career. It was Rennert's 1st title of the year and the 1st of his career.

See also
 Connors–McEnroe rivalry

References

External links
 ITF tournament edition details
 ATP tournament profile

 
Stella Artois Championships
Queen's Club Championships
Stella Artois Championships
Stella Artois Championships
Stella Artois Championships